Saregama India Ltd. (Saregama refers to the first four notes of the Indian musical scale); formerly known as The Gramophone Company Of India Ltd. is India's oldest music label owned by the RP- Sanjiv Goenka Group of companies. The company is listed on the NSE and the BSE with its head office located in Kolkata and other offices in Mumbai, Chennai and Delhi. Apart from music, Saregama also produces films under the brand name Yoodlee Films and multi-language television content. Saregama also retails a music-based hardware platform called Carvaan.

Saregama owns music repertoire across film music, non-film music, Carnatic, Hindustani classical, devotional music, etc. in over 25 Indian languages. The first song recorded in India by Gauhar Jaan in 1902 and the first film made in Bollywood ‘Alam Ara' in 1931 were under the music label.

Saregama purveyor of Carnatic, Hindustani classical, devotional music also promotes dance music like Madhuban mein Radhika Nache .

Saregama holds the rights of 61 movies and over 6000 hours of TV content. With increasing focus in the new music space, Saregama has been cementing its position with new film and non-film acquisition across Hindi, Tamil, Telugu, Bhojpuri, Gujarati, Punjabi and other regional languages.

The music catalogue of Saregama is officially available across various domains for audiences to consume. This includes over-the-top (OTT) music streaming apps (Spotify, Gaana, Wynk, YouTube Music, Hungama,  Resso, Apple Music, Tidal, Pandora, Napster, etc.), broadcasting platforms (Star network, Sony Tv Network, Viacom 18, India TV, Zee, Sun TV Network, etc.), OTT video streaming platforms (Netflix, Amazon Prime, Disney Plus Hotstar, Zee 5, Alt Balaji, Sony Liv, etc.) and social media platforms (Instagram, YouTube, Facebook, Josh, Moj, Triller).

Many Hindi films in recent times have their music on Saregama. These include Kahaani 2, 102 Not Out, Ek Ladki Ko Dekha Toh Aisa Laga, Total Dhamaal and Panga, among others. It has also signed as the official music label for forthcoming films like Bell Bottom, Gangubai Kathiawad, Kurup, Maidaan and the untitled next film of Ranveer Singh with director Shankar.

In the Punjab music space, Saregama has a catalogue of over 8000 tracks.

Over 11,800 tracks are available in the library.

Saregama owns all the songs of MS Subbulakshmi, the first singer to win India's highest civilian award, Bharat Ratna.

In the Telugu space Saregama has over 8000 tracks. Saregama has an extensive collection of Malayalam music with over 7000 tracks of both evergreen film music and non-film music. Saregama has a collection of over 3000 songs of Kannada film and non-film music.  Saregama has over 26,000 tracks in Bengali, including over 7900 Rabindra Sangeet and 1500 Nazrul Geeti. Saregama has over 6000 film and non-film Marathi tracks. Saregama has over 920 songs in Bhojpuri in their catalogue. In the space of Gujarati music, Saregama has over 2900 film and non-film tracks. Saregama also has over 1400 tracks each in Odia and Assamese, comprising both of film and non-film tracks.

Saregama also has a devotional catalogue with over 18,300 tracks, spanning Hindu devotional tracks, Gurbani, Islamic tracks and Christian devotional tracks. It also has an extensive folk music collection spanning folk songs in Bengali, Punjabi, Marathi, and Gujarati.

History

EMI
In 1901, the company began operations by recording the first song in India, as the first overseas branch of Electric & Musical Industries Limited, EMI London. It was incorporated in Calcutta (now Kolkata) as The Gramophone and Typewriter Ltd. The following year, Gramophone inventor Emile Berliner's assistant Fred Gaisberg came to India "on a mission to capture [its] music". Gauhar Jaan became the first Indian artist to be recorded there, on 5 January 1902. In 1907, a record factory was started in Dum Dum in Calcutta, the first outside UK.

On 13 August 1946, it was incorporated as a Private Limited company with the name of ‘The Gramophone Co. (India) Limited'. It was converted into a public company on 28 October 1968 and consequently the name of the company was changed to ‘The Gramophone Company of India Limited'. RPG Group took over the company in 1985 from EMI when the company's financial health was poor. The name of the company was then changed from The Gramophone Company of India Limited to its current name, Saregama India Limited, on 3 November 2000. In 2005, the remaining EMI stake was sold off to the parent company.

HMV
For the first 100 years, the company retailed its products (records, cassettes, CDs) under the brand name HMV which was synonymous with film music in India. From 2000 onwards, it started retailing its products under the brand name, Saregama.

Dum Dum Recording Studio
Saregama's recording studio, called Dum Dum studio, was built in 1928 in Calcutta. It is one of the oldest studios in Southeast Asia. Nobel Laureate Rabindranath Tagore had recorded his songs and poems in his own voice at this studio. Rebel poet Kazi Nazrul Islam's voice was also recorded here. The Dum Dum Recording studio was also a house to manufacturing and production of Gramophone Records and thereafter Music Cassettes.  With advent of digital formats, the physical formats progressively went out of consumer patronage and consequently, these manufacturing facilities
were shut down.

Saregama Carvaan

Carvaan

Carvaan is a portable music player with a pre-loaded collection of 5000 evergreen songs. It is an easy to use device and features in-built stereo speakers. It supports other features like USB, FM, and aux in. Since its inception, Saregama has launched multiple variants of Carvaan in different languages like Hindi, Punjabi, Tamil, Bengali and Marathi.

In 2018, Saregama Carvaan Premium was launched with additional features. There are 52 additional stations (as compared to the base model) and app support is provided for iOS and Android to create playlist and controlling the music system.

In the year 2019, Saregama launched Carvaan 2.O. In addition to the collection of 5000 songs, Wi-Fi connectivity is available which provides access to over 300 audio stations and over 20,000 songs. The content pushed as podcasts includes devotionals, children's rhymes, talk shows, travel, food, and health.  

Carvaan Gold and Carvaan Gold 2.O are the premium versions of Saregama Carvaan which have all the old features of Carvaan along with Wi-Fi connectivity, additional audio stations, Champagne Gold and Rose Gold colours, and a Harman/Kardon sound system.

The other variants include Carvaan GO, Carvaan Mini and Carvaan Karaoke. Carvaan can be purchased online through Amazon in India, USA, Canada, UK and UAE.

Carvaan GO

Carvaan GO is a portable digital audio player with in-built speakers and a pre-loaded collection of 3000 retro Hindi songs by yesteryear's singing legends. The songs are divided into various categories such as Artistes, Specials and Playlists. The personal device has a rechargeable battery with approximately seven hours of playtime. The additional features include Bluetooth, aux cable, micro SD, and FM/AM options. Carvaan Go Gold is available in Champagne Gold and Rose Gold color variants with Harman/Kardon sound.

Carvaan Mini

Carvaan Mini is a portable music player with multiple variants of Bhakti, Rabindrasangeet, and Gurbani. Other variants have a collection of 351 songs dedicated to Hindi legends, Marathi legends, Bengali legends, Kannada legends, Malayalam legends, Tamil legends, Telugu legends, and Carvaan Mini M. S. Subbulakshmi, consisting of 351 songs.

Saregama recently launched Carvaan Mini Shrimad Bhagavad Gita, pre-loaded with 18 Adhyays, 700 verses of the Bhagavad Gita and 101 Krishna Bhajans. Carvaan Mini Art of Living with knowledge task by Gurudev Sri Sri Ravi Shankar.

Carvaan Mini Kids, a dedicated variant for children, comes pre-loaded with over 80 English and Hindi rhymes, over 300 stories, over 15 learning topics, and over 30 mantras and devotional songs. Apart from pre-loaded content, it works as a Bluetooth speaker and offers USB and aux in compatibility. A special edition – Carvaan Mini Kids – Chhota Bheem has also been launched.

Carvaan Karaoke
Carvaan Karaoke launched in the year 2020. It is the top end version of Carvaan with all its features plus 1000 Hindi karaoke tracks.  It comes pre-loaded with 5000 evergreen Hindi songs, 1000 karaoke tracks, over 300 daily updated podcast stations, FM/AM, Bluetooth, USB and aux in. Carvaan Karaoke has an inbuilt screen to display the karaoke screen, which slides upwards upon pressing the karaoke button. The karaoke lyrics can be displayed on a TV or projector by connecting it with an HDMI cable. It comes along with two wireless microphones. Karaoke tracks are classified under Actors, Artistes, Eras, Moods and Top 50 for easy and quick selection. It comes in the classic Metallic Red color.

Awards

Yoodlee Films 

Yoodlee Films is the film division of Saregama India. Founded in 2017, it is headquartered in Mumbai and has made 17 films across genres and languages, for both theatrical release and for video streaming platforms like Netflix, Disney+ Hotstar and Zee 5. The film Hamid by Aijaz Khan was bestowed with two National Awards in the 66th National Awards for Best Film in Urdu and Best Child Artist for Talha Arshad Reshi. Hamid also won the Muhammad Al-Ameen Award, a diploma of honour for the best film on peace at the 37th Fajr International Film Festival. At the 67th National Film Awards, actor Naga Vishal won the National Award for 'Best Child Artist' for his role in the film. Additionally, Sushama Deshpande received a special mention for her acting in the movie Ajji, at the Indian Film Festival of Los Angeles. Ali Haji also won the Best Child Actor Award for the movie Noblemen at the New York Indian Film Festival in 2018.

Film Discography

Hindi

Tamil

Television content
Saregama produces content for TV channels in Tamil, Hindi, Telugu, Kannada, Malayalam, Marathi and Bengali. The company has created many serials and shows.
Soolam (2001)
Velan (2002)
My Dear Bhootham (2004)
Raja Rajeswari (2005)
Vepilaikari (2007-2008)
Athipookkal (2007-2012)
Pondadi thevai (2010-2012)
Valli (2012-2019)
Pillai Nila (2012-2014)
Bhairavi Aavigalukku Priyamanaval (2012-2017)
Chandralekha (2014–2022)
Roja (2018–2022)
Anbe Vaa (2020–present)
Ilakkiya  (2022-present)
Iniya (2022-present)

References

External links

Official Website

1946 establishments in British India
Indian record labels
EMI
Companies listed on the National Stock Exchange of India
Companies listed on the Bombay Stock Exchange
RPSG Group